Tom was launched in 1771 in Britain. Between 1778 and 1792 she was a West Indiaman, trading between Lancaster and Jamaica, St Lucia, and Grenada. New owners in 1792 sailed Tom as a slave ship in the triangular trade in enslaved people. She was condemned in 1794 at Barbados after having delivered the slaves she had acquired in the Cameroons.

Career
Tom first appeared in Lloyd's Register (LR) in the volume for 1778.

Captain Tobias Collins sailed Hope to West Africa in 1791–1792, with Ainsworth replacing him at some point, and Tom in 1792, replacing Ainsworth. LR for 1793 shows Ainsworth replacing Collins as master on Hope. The time and place of the exchange is an open question. Before Collins left on Hope, on 26 September 1791 James Savery had instructed him to sail on to the Cameroons to gather as much ivory and other dead cargo as he could find. 

Captain Ainsworth sailed from Liverpool on 24 March 1792, bound for the Cameroons. Tom arrived at Barbados in November 1793 with 39 slaves.

Fate
Tom was condemned at Barbados in 1794.

Citations

References
 

1771 ships
Age of Sail merchant ships of England
Slave ships